The Indiana University Robert H. McKinney School of Law (IU McKinney) is located on the campus of Indiana University – Purdue University Indianapolis (IUPUI) in Indianapolis, Indiana, the urban campus of Indiana University. In the summer of 2001, the school moved to its new building, Lawrence W. Inlow Hall. IU McKinney is one of two law schools operated by Indiana University, the other being the Indiana University Maurer School of Law (IU Maurer) in Bloomington.  Although both law schools are part of Indiana University, each law school is wholly independent of the other. According to IU McKinney's 2019 ABA-required disclosures, 59% of the Class of 2018 obtained full-time, long-term, J.D.-required employment within ten months after graduation.

Several of IU McKinney's programs have drawn national attention and honors. U.S. News & World Report ranks the school 11th in the nation for its health care law program, 23rd for legal writing, and 23rd for the part-time law program. Additionally, IU McKinney counts among its alumni many distinguished leaders in politics, public service, and the judiciary, including two United States Vice Presidents (Dan Quayle and Mike Pence) and numerous senators, representatives, governors, and ambassadors. In a listing of "The 50 Most Impressive Law School Buildings in the World," IU McKinney's building, Lawrence W. Inlow Hall, ranked 13th.

History 
The Indiana University Robert H. McKinney School of Law traces its origins to the late nineteenth century when the first of its private predecessor schools, the Indiana Law School, began operating in 1894. A full-time day school, the Indiana Law School was part of a newly formed University of Indianapolis that also included Butler University, the Medical College of Indiana and the Indiana Dental School. All three professional schools later became part of Indiana University. Among the first trustees of the school were former United States President, Benjamin Harrison, and Indiana industrialist, Eli Lilly.

In 1898, a second predecessor school, the Indianapolis College of Law, was founded, offering a two-year evening program. This school, located in the Pythian Building in downtown Indianapolis, was advertised in 1906 as "known everywhere for its successful graduates," and boasted a tuition of $10 per term. A few years later, another evening school, the American Central Law School, was established. In 1914, the Indianapolis College of Law and American Central Law School merged to become the Benjamin Harrison Law School, which was also an evening school. In 1936 the Benjamin Harrison Law School and the Indiana Law School merged, taking the name of the latter, and offering both day and evening programs.

In 1944, the Indiana Law School affiliated with Indiana University, becoming the Indianapolis Division of the Indiana University School of Law. Beginning the following year, the school was housed in the Maennerchor Building, an architectural landmark in Indianapolis. The school gained autonomy in 1968, becoming the Indiana University School of Law – Indianapolis, the largest law school in the state of Indiana and the only law school in the state to offer both full- and part-time programs. The school moved into a new building at 735 West New York Street in 1970 where it remained until moving to Lawrence W. Inlow Hall, located at 530 West New York Street, in May 2001.

The school's name was changed in December 2011 in recognition of a $24 million gift from Robert H. McKinney, who previously served as chairman and CEO of First Indiana Corporation and is among the founders of Bose McKinney & Evans LLP, one of the largest law firms in Indianapolis. The gift was the largest in school history and was part of an arrangement to match funds with an IUPUI fundraising campaign, for a total value of $31.5 million. The school was renamed after McKinney.

Online programs
IU McKinney has been an early mover in quality online course development, with a regular offering of up to ten courses per semester, including the Summer term, offered online.  Most of these classes are asynchronous online courses taught by full time tenured members of the law school faculty.  IU McKinney Online courses are available to students in the JD,  LLM, and Masters of Jurisprudence programs; and to visiting students earning credits to transfer back to their home institutions. These online offerings include core, required, and highly recommended courses, as well as upper level specialty courses. Most IU McKinney Online courses have been produced in a 1-1 partnership with Ph.D. course designers working with Indiana University e-Learning Design and Services or the IUPUI Center for Teaching and Learning. The director of online programs is a senior member of the tenured law faculty, Professor Max Huffman.

Employment
According to IU McKinney's 2019 ABA-required disclosures, 61% of the Class of 2018 obtained full-time, long-term, J.D.-required employment within ten months after graduation. Across the three categories of employment ordinarily considered to be appropriate for comparison, the ABA 2019 summary reports that IU McKinney graduates were employed at an 88% rate, compared to a national average of 86% and an Indiana average of 88%.

Costs
The total cost of attendance (indicating the cost of tuition, fees, and living expenses) at IU - McKinney for the 2019-2020 academic year for an Indiana resident was $49,710, and $69,770 for a non-resident. The Law School Transparency estimated debt-financed cost of attendance for three years is $185,611 for an Indiana resident and $258,039 for a non-Indiana resident.

Rankings 
Of the 203 American Bar Association (ABA)-accredited law schools evaluated for its 2019 edition, U.S. News & World Report ranked the school in the top 100 (#98) best law schools, 8th in legal writing, 10th in healthcare law (tied with Harvard) and 18th in part-time legal programs. In 2010, based on the number of graduates selected for inclusion in Super Lawyers magazine in 2009, that publication ranked the school 44th out of 180 law schools considered. The school has also sat atop the Top 10 Law Schools in Indiana Super Lawyers list since the list's inception in 2010. The school also found itself listed in the top 10 (#9) by US News in 2014 for highest yield – i.e., percentage of accepted applicants who enroll. The publication "Best Choice Schools" has consistently ranked the school's facility as one of the nicest law school building in the world.

Law reviews

Indiana Law Review 
The Indiana Law Review is a legal periodical edited and managed by students of the law school. Each year, the Law Review publishes one volume, which consists of four issues. Generally, the first three issues contain two to four lead articles and three to five student Notes. The fourth issue is the final and longest issue of each year. The Survey of Recent Developments in Indiana Law contains fifteen to twenty articles written by professors and Indiana practitioners summarizing the significant changes and developments in Indiana law during the prior year (October to October).

Indiana International & Comparative Law Review 
The Indiana International & Comparative Law Review (II&CLR) is published annually and has been published continuously since 1991. Although the II&CLR has typically published three issues per year and held symposia biennially, it now hosts symposia annually and is slated to publish four issues for Volume XXIV. The II&CLR is devoted to the study and analysis of current international and comparative legal issues and problems.

Indiana Health Law Review 
The Indiana Health Law Review addresses issues related to bioethics, malpractice liability, managed care, anti-trust, health care organizations, medical-legal research, legal medicine, food and drug, and other current health-related topics. The Law Review was first published in the 2004-2005 academic year.

European Journal of Law Reform 
The European Journal of Law Reform was launched in 1998 to provide a forum for interdisciplinary debate on proposals for law reform and the development of private and public international law in Europe. The Journal is jointly edited by faculty of IU McKinney, the Institute of Advanced Legal Studies (University of London), and the University of Basel School of Law in Switzerland, with the assistance of a team of student editors from the II&CLR.

Centers

Center for Intellectual Property Law and Innovation
The Center for Intellectual Property Law and Innovation is a center for intellectual property law and related transactional areas. It is affiliated with both Purdue University and Indiana University, with strong ties to the IU Medical Center and the IU Kelley School of Business.

William S. and Christine S. Hall Center for Law and Health 
IU McKinney houses the William S. and Christine S. Hall Center for Law and Health. The Center for Law and Health was established in 1987 to conduct legal and empirical research on health care law and policy issues in Indiana and the nation and was later renamed in honor of William S. and Christine S. Hall. The Center houses the Indiana Health Law Review, a health care law and policy-focused law journal.

Center for International and Comparative Law 
The Center for International and Comparative Law is the nucleus for all of the law school's international law programs, including two international related law reviews. The Indiana International & Comparative Law Review was launched in 1991, devoted to the study and analysis of current international legal issues and problems. The European Journal of Law Reform was launched in 1998 to provide a forum for interdisciplinary debate on proposals for law reform and the development of private and public international law in Europe. That journal is jointly edited by faculty of IU McKinney, the Institute of Advanced Legal Studies (University of London), and the University of Basel School of Law in Switzerland, with the assistance of a team of student editors from the II&CLR.

Notable faculty 
 Cleon H. Foust
 Lawrence Jegen
 Edwin R. Keedy 
 Jon Krahulik
 Gerard Magliocca
 David Orentlicher
 Gary R. Roberts
 Florence Roisman

The Ruth Lilly Law library 
The Ruth Lilly Law Library is the school's law library. The Library has an estimated 603,000 volumes in print and microform. Included in the Library is a 20,000-volume Commonwealth collection.

Alumni 
The law school has over 10,000 alumni located in every state in the nation and several foreign countries. IU McKinney counts among its alumni many distinguished leaders in politics, public service, and the judiciary:

 Frederick Van Nuys (1900), U.S. Senator
 Harry G. Leslie (1907), Governor of Indiana
 Arthur Raymond Robinson (1910), U.S. Senator
 Samuel D. Jackson (1917), U.S. Senator
 Virginia Dill McCarty (1950), first woman appointed to full four-year term as a U.S. Attorney (Southern District of Indiana), first woman to run for Governor of Indiana
 Edgar Whitcomb (1950), Governor of Indiana
 Harriette Bailey Conn (1955), first woman and the first African American to serve as Indiana's state public defender
 Brent Dickson (1968), Chief Justice of the Indiana Supreme Court 
 Dan Coats (1972), U.S. Representative, Ambassador to Germany, U.S. Senator, and Director of National Intelligence
 Dan Quayle (1974), former U.S. Representative, U.S. Senator, and 44th Vice President of the United States
 Marilyn Quayle (1974), American lawyer, novelist, and Second Lady of the United States from 1989 until 1993
 Ahmad Natabaya (1981), former judge on the Constitutional Court of Indonesia
 Brian Bosma (1984), former Speaker of the Indiana House of Representatives 
 Willard Gemmill (1902), Justice of the Indiana Supreme Court
 John R. Gregg (1984), former Speaker of the Indiana House of Representatives and Democratic candidate for Governor of Indiana
 Lawson Harvey (1882), Justice of the Indiana Supreme Court
 Susan Brooks (1985), U.S. Representative
 Mike Pence (1986), U.S. Representative, Governor of Indiana, and 48th Vice President of the United States
 John S. Pistole, Transportation Security Administration administrator 
 Todd Rokita (1995), U.S. Representative, former Secretary of State of Indiana, and Indiana Attorney General.
 Steven David, Justice of the Indiana Supreme Court
 Mark Massa, Justice of the Indiana Supreme Court
 George Tremain (1900), Justice of the Indiana Supreme Court
 Dan Flanagan (1921), Justice of the Indiana Supreme Court
 Jon Krahulik (1969), Justice of the Indiana Supreme Court
 William L. Taylor, Indiana Attorney General
 John J. Dillon (1952), Indiana Attorney General
 Marc Griffin (1992), American lawyer, world's youngest judge
 Todd Young (2006), U.S. Senator

References

External links 

Indiana University–Purdue University Indianapolis
Law schools in Indiana
1894 establishments in Indiana
Educational institutions established in 1894